Gaute Heivoll (born 13 March 1978) is a Norwegian poet, novelist, playwright and short story writer.

He made his literary debut in 2002 with the short story collection  Liten dansende gutt. Among his novels are Omars siste dager from 2003 and Ungdomssangen from 2005.

He was awarded the Brage Prize in 2010 for the novel Før jeg brenner ned, translated into English as Before I Burn.

References

1978 births
Living people
21st-century Norwegian poets
Norwegian male poets
21st-century Norwegian novelists
Norwegian dramatists and playwrights
Norwegian male novelists
Norwegian male dramatists and playwrights
21st-century Norwegian male writers